The Institute for the Study of the Jewish Question was founded in 1934 and was affiliated with the Reich Ministry of Propaganda under Joseph Goebbels. In 1939 the institution was called "Anti-Semitic Action" and from 1942 "Anti-Jewish Action".

The institute was founded in 1934 by Eberhard Taubert on behalf of the Reich Propaganda Ministry. Originally, the institute was to be a joint research center against Judaism, Freemasonry and liberalism, but soon the tasks were separated. From the beginning, the Propaganda Ministry tried to camouflage the institute's affiliation with the government, since negative foreign policy consequences were feared.

See also 
 Institute for the Study and Elimination of Jewish Influence on German Church Life
 Institute for Research on the Jewish Question
 German Christians (movement)
 Eberhard Taubert
 Reich Ministry of Public Enlightenment and Propaganda

References 

1930s in politics
Antisemitism in Germany
Former research institutes
Holocaust-related organizations
Jewish Nazi German history
Nazi Party organizations
Nazi propaganda
Organizations established in 1934
Political organisations based in Germany
Politics of Nazi Germany